Srbuhi Grigoryan (born 29 December 1974), is an Armenian politician, Member of the National Assembly of Armenia of Bright Armenia's faction.

References 

1973 births
Living people
21st-century Armenian politicians
21st-century Armenian women politicians